Albert V of Saxe-Lauenburg (mid 1330s – 1370) was the second son of Duke Albert IV of Saxe-Lauenburg and Beata of Schwerin (*?–before 1341*), daughter of Gunzelin VI, Count of Schwerin. Albert succeeded his elder brother John III in 1356 as Duke of Saxe-Bergedorf-Mölln, a branch duchy of Saxe-Lauenburg. He died without an heir and was succeeded by his younger brother Eric III.

Albert V, short in money, sold – after consenting with his brother Eric III – the Herrschaft of Mölln to the city of Lübeck in return for 9737.50 Lübeck marks. The parties agreed upon a repurchase, however, only by the duke or his heirs for themselves, but not as a middleperson for someone else. Lübeck considered this acquisition crucial, since Mölln was an important stage for trade between Brunswick and Lunenburg – here especially salt – via Lübeck to Scandinavia and back. Therefore, Lübeck manned Mölln with armed guards maintaining law and order on the roads.

However, thrifty Albert V, plotted for new sources of revenues. So Albert and his cousin Eric II of Saxe-Lauenburg–Ratzeburg-Lauenburg agreed on ravaging merchants and other travellers passing their duchies near Hamburg. So in 1363 the city of Hamburg and Adolphus VII, Count of Schauenburg and Holstein-Kiel, supported by his relative Prince-Archbishop Albert II of Bremen, freed the streets northeast of the city from the brigandage by Eric II and Albert V, conquering the latter's castle in Bergedorf.

By 25 January 1366 Albert married Catherine of Werle-Güstrow (*?–after 17 December 1402*), daughter of Lord Nicholas III of Werle-Güstrow. Catherine and Albert had no children.

Ancestry

Notes

|-

1370 deaths
Albert 05
Albert 05
1330s births